Jeremy Raymond Taylor (born June 2, 2003) is an American actor. He is known for his role as Ben Hanscom in the 2017 adaptation of Stephen King's novel It and its 2019 sequel, as well as the role of Sonny Quinn in Goosebumps 2: Haunted Halloween (2018).

Early life
Taylor was raised in Bluff City, Tennessee, the youngest of four boys of Tracy, a band manager, and Michael Taylor. He traveled with his mother and developed a stage persona that intrigued his family. At the age of 8, he was signed to a talent manager and began his acting career.

Filmography

Film

Television

References

External links

2003 births
Living people
21st-century American male actors
American male child actors
American male film actors
American male television actors
People from Sullivan County, Tennessee